Seedy is a compilation album by the American ska punk band Operation Ivy. The album was released in 1996 through Karma Kredit Records. Karma Kredit was a pseudonym for David Hayes' Very Small Records. The compilation collects studio outtakes, live tracks, and demo recordings. The tracks in this compilation were recorded on a mono speaker tape deck recorder. All releases are currently out of print and occasionally surface on eBay.

Track listing
"Healthy Body" (Uncut Version)
"Someday"
"Plea for Peace"
"Trouble Bound"
"Uncertain"
"Hangin' Out"
"Left Behind"
"Old Friendships"
"Hedgecore"
"Steppin' Out"
"The End" (outro)

Personnel
 Jesse Michaels - lead vocals
 Lint - guitar, backing vocals
 Matt McCall - bass, backing vocals
 Dave Mello - drums

Notes
 Intro recorded in Manhattan
 Tracks 1-3 recorded November 27, 1987. Rough Mixes from "Hectic" Session.
 Tracks 4-7 and 10 recorded August 24, 1987. Gilman Demo
 Track 8 recorded March 17, 1988. Live on FM 88.7 KSPC Radio Station in Claremont, CA.
 Track 9 recorded April 21, 1988. Live on WFMU Radio Station
 Track 11 recorded in Kansas

References

External links
 Seedy

1996 compilation albums
Operation Ivy (band) albums